Coaches of the Southwest Conference bestowed the following individual awards at the end of each football season.

Coach of the Year

References

College football conference awards and honors
Individual awards